Rim Nuea is a tambon (subdistrict) of Mae Rim District, in Chiang Mai Province, Thailand. In 2005 it had a population of 3,336 people. The tambon contains four villages.

References

Tambon of Chiang Mai province
Populated places in Chiang Mai province